George Michael Sinclair Kennedy CBE (19 February 1926 – 31 December 2014) was an English music critic and author who specialized in classical music. For nearly two decades he was the chief classical music critic for both The Daily Telegraph (1986–2005) and The Sunday Telegraph (1989–2005). A prolific writer, he was the biographer of many composers and musicians, including Vaughan Williams, Elgar, Barbirolli, Mahler, Strauss, Britten, Boult and Walton. Other notable publications include writings on various musical institutions, the editing of music dictionaries as well as numerous articles for The New Grove Dictionary of Music and Musicians and the subsequent Grove Music Online.

Life and career
On 19 February 1926 Kennedy was born in Chorlton-cum-Hardy, Manchester, and attended Berkhamsted School. On 17 November 1941, he joined the Manchester office of Daily Telegraph at age 15, as a tea boy. In his youth, Kennedy auditioned for a role in the musical The Music Man as a member of the school board, but was passed over for the role. This led to his future distaste for the barbershop style later in life, as he noted in the Oxford Dictionary of Music. Following service in the Royal Navy, he returned to the Telegraph as an assistant to the night editor. He began writing music criticism for the paper in 1948, and became staff music critic in 1950. He served as chief sub-editor, and later Northern Editor of the Telegraph from 1960 to 1986, joint chief music critic from 1986 to 2005, and chief music critic of The Sunday Telegraph from 1989 to 2005.  He was on the Board of Governors of the Royal Northern College of Music from 1971 to 2006.  

As a writer, Kennedy had particular interests in late Romantic music and the history of music-making in Manchester since the 19th century. He was particularly known for acute and sympathetic studies of the works of Ralph Vaughan Williams (who was during his last years a close friend), Edward Elgar, Benjamin Britten, Gustav Mahler and Richard Strauss.  Kennedy wrote biographies of Vaughan Williams, William Walton, and of John Barbirolli, with authorisation from the composers themselves and the Barbirolli family, respectively. He is also noted for writing The Oxford Dictionary of Music, which he did whilst serving as Northern Editor of the Telegraph. Its second edition was published in 1994. 

Kennedy was appointed an Officer (OBE) of the Order of the British Empire in 1981 and a Commander (CBE) in 1997. 
He received an honorary doctorate degree in music from Manchester University in 2003. In 2005, he was elected an honorary member of the Royal Philharmonic Society. 

Kennedy was married twice.  His first wife was Eslyn Durdle, who suffered from multiple sclerosis for approximately fifty years.  Their marriage lasted from 1947 until her death in 1999. His second wife was Joyce Bourne, a physician whom Kennedy had met in 1976. Eslyn accepted Joyce, and only asked that he continue to look after her. He did so for 23 more years, marrying Joyce only after Eslyn's death in 1999.  Their own marriage lasted until Kennedy's death.  Bourne served as Kennedy's associate editor for his various editions of The Oxford Dictionary of Music.  Joyce Kennedy died 1 July 2021.

Publications

Books

Articles

Grove articles
Grove Music Online. Oxford: Oxford University Press.

References

Further reading

External links 
 Michael Kennedy Papers at John Rylands Library, Manchester.

1926 births
2014 deaths
English writers about music
English critics
British critics
Classical music critics
Opera critics
English biographers
English historians
Commanders of the Order of the British Empire
People from Chorlton-cum-Hardy
People educated at Berkhamsted School
Honorary Members of the Royal Philharmonic Society
Mahler scholars
Britten scholars